John Davidson (3 September 1851 – 19 September 1919) was a Scottish international rugby union player who played for RIE College RFC in Surrey, England.

Born in Banchory in 1851, Davidson played as a Forward.

Davidson played in two early rugby union international matches for Scotland against England in 1873 and 1874.

References 

1851 births
1919 deaths
Alumni of the Royal Indian Engineering College
RIE College RFC players
Rugby union forwards
Rugby union players from Aberdeenshire
Scotland international rugby union players
Scottish rugby union players